The 2005 First Division season was the 37th of the amateur  competition of the first-tier football in the Gambia.  The tournament was organized by the Gambian Football Association (GFA) .  The season began on 7 January and finished on 3 July.  Wallidan FC won the fifteenth title and qualified for and competed in the 2006 CAF Champions League the following season.  Bakau United FC, winner of the 2005 Gambian Cup participated in the 2006 CAF Confederation Cup the following season..

The season featured a total of 162 matches and scored a total of 132 goals, less than half than last season.

Wallidan FC was the defending team of the title. Wallidan finished with 29 points, nearly a quarter less than last season and scored the most goals numbering 19, nearly 40% fewer than last season.

Participating clubs

 Wallidan FC
 Steve Biko FC
 Real de Banjul
 Kaira SIlo FC - Promoted from the Second Division
 Hawks FC

 Gambia Ports Authority FC
 Armed Forces FC
 Bakau United FC
 Sait Matty FC
 Gamtel FC - Promoted from the Second Division

Overview
The league was contested by 10 teams with Wallidan FC again winning the championship.

League standings

See also
GFA League First Division

Footnotes

External links
Historic results at rsssf.com

Gambia
Gambia
GFA League First Division seasons
First